Progress is an unincorporated community in the Peace River Country of British Columbia, Canada.  It is located on the British Columbia Railway line (now Canadian National Railway where it crosses the John Hart Highway.

References

Unincorporated settlements in British Columbia
Peace River Country